At the River  is a debut feature film directed by Eva Neymann. He entered the main program of the Moscow International Film Festival in 2007. Film-participant of the 36th Rotterdam International Film Festival in 2007.

Plot
One fine day from the life of two elderly women, mothers, and daughters who lived together all their lives. One day, a young official comes to them, who inadvertently makes his mother feel young again. On this sunny day, she decides to go with her daughter for a walk along the river. It's clear to both of them that the best days of their lives are in the past, and that, walking around like this, they make a comedic impression. But today they do not care — they enjoy a walk, good weather and a river.

Cast
 Nina Ruslanova as  Masha Konkova
 Maria Politseymako as Klavdia Petrovna Konkova
 Sergey Bekhterev  as  deputy's assistant
 Natalya Buzko as Nastya's mother
 Yuri Nevgamonny as captain of a pleasure craft

Awards and nominations
 Miskolc International Film Festival — Critics Award	(won)
 Moscow International Film Festival  — Golden St. George		(nom)
 GoEast — Award of the Federal Foreign Office		(won)

References

External links
 
 Criticism of the Film

Ukrainian drama films
2007 drama films
Ukrainian-language films
2000s Russian-language films
Films set in Ukraine
2007 directorial debut films
2007 films